The many-horned adder (Bitis cornuta) is a viper species. It is found in certain rocky desert areas, mostly along the Atlantic coast of southern Africa, in western South Africa and southwestern Namibia. It has characteristic tufts of "horns" above each eye.  Like all other vipers, it is venomous. No subspecies are currently recognized.

Taxonomy
Common names include many-horned adder, hornsman, western hornsman adder, and western many-horned adder.

The type locality given is "Cap de Bonne-espérance" (Cape of Good Hope, South Africa). Actually, according to Patterson's itinerary, the type was observed in coastal Namaqualand, on 1 September 1779.

Description
Small and stout, it grows to a typical total length (body and tail) of 30–50 cm (about 12–20 inches).

Two to five raised, horn-like scales occur above each eye.

Dorsally, it has a  grey to reddish-brown ground colour, overlaid with four longitudinal series of large, dark-brown blotches, which are squarish or parallelogram-like in shape, and edged with white. Ventrally, it is whitish or tan, either uniform or speckled with dark brown.  On the dorsal surface of the head, dark, symmetrical markings  may form an arrowhead.

Distribution and habitat
The many-horned adder ranges from the coastal region of southwest Namibia through west and southwest Cape Province in South Africa, with a few isolated populations in eastern Cape Province.

This species prefers rocky desert areas in dwarf succulent veld and mountain slopes in heathland vegetation.

Behavior
With a nervous disposition, when disturbed, it will hiss loudly and strike so energetically that most of its body is lifted off the ground in the process. However, it usually settles down in captivity.

References

Further reading
Branch, Bill. 2004. Field Guide to Snakes and Other Reptiles of Southern Africa. Sanibel Island, Florida: Ralph Curtis Books. 399 pp. . (Bitis cornuta, pp. 116–117 + Plate 13.) 
Daudin FM. 1803. Histoire Naturelle, Générale et Particulière des Reptiles; Ouvrage faisant suite à l'Histoire Naturelle générale et particulière, composée par LECLERC DE BUFFON; et rédigée par C.S. SONNINI, membre de plusieurs Sociétés savantes. Tome VI. Paris: F. Dufart. 447 pp. (Vipera cornuta, p. 188.)

External links

 Many-horned adder (Bitis cornuta) at ARKive. Accessed 5 October 2006.
 . Accessed 1 March 2007.

Bitis
Snakes of Africa
Reptiles of Namibia
Reptiles of South Africa
Reptiles described in 1803
Taxa named by François Marie Daudin